Aetos Makrychiri Football Club is a Greek football club based in Makrychori, Larissa, Greece.

Honors

Domestic

 Larissa FCA Champions: 2
 1989–90, 2019-20 
 Larissa FCA Cup Winners: 1
 1989-90

References

Larissa
Association football clubs established in 1961
1961 establishments in Greece
Gamma Ethniki clubs